
Year 356 BC was a year of the pre-Julian Roman calendar. At the time, it was known as the Year of the Consulship of Ambustus and Laenas (or, less frequently, year 398 Ab urbe condita). The denomination 356 BC for this year has been used since the early medieval period, when the Anno Domini calendar era became the prevalent method in Europe for naming years.

Events 
 By place 

 Persian Empire 
 Having blamed the defeats by Philip II in Thessaly and Chalcidice on his colleagues, Chares is left as sole Athenian commander. Chares is in need of money for his war effort, but frowns upon asking it from the Athenians so, partly compelled by his mercenaries, he enters the service of the insurgent Persian satrap Artabazus of Phrygia who rewards Chares very generously.
 Artabazus of Phrygia is also supported by the Thebans, who send him 5,000 men under their general Pammenes. With the assistance of these and other allies, Artabazus defeats his Persian enemies in two great battles.
 The Persian King Artaxerxes III orders all the satraps (governors) of his empire to dismiss their mercenaries. The Athenians, who have originally approved their mercenaries' collaboration with Artabazus of Phrygia, order them to leave due to their fear of Persian support for the revolting states of Chios, Rhodes, and Cos. Thebes follows suit and withdraws its mercenaries.
 With King Artaxerxes III succeeding in depriving Artabazus of his Athenian and Theban allies, Artabazus is defeated by the Persian King's general, Autophradates.

 Greece 
 Philip II of Macedon secretly offers the city of Amphipolis back to the Athenians in exchange for the valuable port of Pydna. Despite the Athenians being willing to comply, both Pydna and Potidaea are conquered by the Macedonians (along with other Athenian strongholds in Thessaly and Chalcidice) despite being defended by Athenian forces led by general and mercenary commander, Chares, as well as generals Iphicrates and Timotheus.
 With Pydna and Potidaea occupied, Philip II decides to keep Amphipolis anyway. He also takes the city of Crenides from the Odrysae and renames it Philippi.
 The Phocians capture and sack Delphi in whose territory the famous temple and oracle stand. A sacred war is declared against them by the other members of the Great Amphictyonic League. The Phocians, led by two capable generals, Philomelus and Onomarchus, use Delphi's riches to hire a mercenary army to carry the war into Boeotia and Thessaly.
 The Social War begins between the Second Athenian League, led by Athens, and its revolting allies of Chios, Rhodes, and Kos as well as the independent state Byzantium. Mausolus, the tyrant of Caria, instigates the rebellion against the Athenian control of these states. The revolting allies ravage the islands of Lemnos and Imbros which are loyal to Athens.
 The Athenian generals Chares and Chabrias are given command of the Athenian fleet with the aim of defeating the rebellious cities. However, Chabrias' fleet is defeated and he is killed in its attack on the island of Chios, off the coast of Ionia.
 Chares is given complete command of the Athenian fleet and withdraws to the Hellespont to move against Byzantium. The generals Timotheus, Iphicrates and his son Menestheus are sent to help him when the enemy fleet is sighted on the Hellespont. Timotheus and Iphicrates refuse to engage due to a severe gale, but Chares does engage and lose many of his ships. Timotheus and Iphicrates are accused by Chares and put on trial, however only Timotheus is condemned to pay a fine.

 Roman Republic 
 Gaius Marcius Rutilus is the first plebeian to be chosen as a dictator in Rome.

 China 
 With his reforms initiated in this year, the Chinese prime minister Shang Yang starts to transform the once marginal and frontier State of Qin to become the most dominant military force amongst the Warring States of China by the 3rd century BC.

 By topic 

 Architecture 
 July 21 (traditional date) – The Temple of Artemis at Ephesus is burned down by a madman named Herostratus, destroying one of the Seven Wonders of the World. The great temple was built by Croesus, king of Lydia, in about 550 BC and was famous not only for its great size (110 metres by 55 metres), but also for the magnificent works of art that adorned it.

Births 

 July 20/21 – Alexander the Great, King of Macedonia (d. 323 BC)
 Hephaestion, Macedonian general, soldier, aristocrat, and companion of Alexander the Great (d. 324 BC)

Deaths 
 Herostratus
 Philistus

References